Leptothrix is a monotypic genus of dwarf spiders containing the single species, Leptothrix hardyi. It was first described by Anton Menge in 1869.

See also
 List of Linyphiidae species (I–P)

References

Linyphiidae
Palearctic spiders
Spiders described in 1850